"Comeback" is the first single from Australian rock band Grinspoon's sixth album Six to Midnight. The song gained radio airplay in Australia and had a music video filmed for it. The song peaked at No. 48 on the ARIA Singles Chart.

Track listing 
 Comeback — 3:07
 Progress — 3:20

Charts

References

2009 singles
Grinspoon songs
2009 songs
Songs written by Phil Jamieson
Universal Records singles